Həzrə (also, Khazra and Khazrya) is a village and municipality in the Qabala Rayon of Azerbaijan.  It has a population of 324.

References 

Populated places in Qabala District